The  was a commuter electric multiple unit (EMU) train type operated by the private railway operator Hankyu Corporation on the Hankyu Takarazuka Main Line from 1956 until 1989.

Build details

1st batch
As with the similar Kobe Line 1010 series sets, the 1100 series sets were built from 1956 onward, consisting of two-car sets formed of one motored car and one non-powered trailer car, with cars numbered 1100 to 1103 and 1150 to 1153.

2nd batch
The second batch appeared in 1957, consisting of eight cars (two pairs of semi-permanently coupled 2-car sets), numbered 1104 to 1107 and 1154 to 1157.

3rd batch
The third batch appeared in 1958, consisting of eight cars (two pairs of semi-permanently coupled 2-car sets), numbered 1108 to 1111 and 1158 to 1161. These sets differed from earlier batches in having three doors per side instead of the earlier two.

4th batch
The fourth batch appeared in 1959, consisting of twelve cars (two pairs of semi-permanently coupled 2-car sets plus four motor (Mc) cars), numbered 1112 to 1115, 1162 to 1165, and 1140 to 1143. These all had three doors per side.

5th batch
The fifth batch appeared in 1960, consisting of a further five driving motor trailer (Mc) cars, numbered 1144 to 1148. These cars had three doors per side.

6th batch
The sixth batch appeared in 1961, consisting of six driving trailer (Tc) cars, numbered 1190 to 1195.

Later developments
Some of the 1100 series cars were retrofitted with roof-mounted air-conditioning between 1976 and 1977.

Withdrawal and resale

The 1100 series cars were withdrawn between 1984 and 1991. One four-car set was sold to the Nose Electric Railway, classified as 1000 series.

See also
 Hankyu 1300 series (1957), a similar variant introduced on the Kyoto Lines from 1957

References

Electric multiple units of Japan
1100 series
Train-related introductions in 1956

ja:阪急1010系電車
600 V DC multiple units
1500 V DC multiple units of Japan
Alna Koki rolling stock